Joseph Rossi (born 1979) is an American football coach who is the defensive coordinator and linebackers coach for the University of Minnesota football team.

Early life
Rossi grew up in Pittsburgh, Pennsylvania where he attended Central Catholic High School. He competed on the football team as a defensive lineman. Rossi then accepted a scholarship to continue his playing career at Allegheny College. He was a three-time All-North Coast Athletic Conference (NCAC).

Coaching career
On March 12, 2012, Rossi was named the special teams coordinator for the Rutgers Scarlet Knights football team. In 2013, Rossi was elevated to defensive coordinator for the Scarlet Knights.

Rossi was named Gophers defensive line coach in January 2018 after working as a quality control assistant for Minnesota in 2017. On November 24, 2018 Joe Rossi was promoted to defensive coordinator. In 2022, he coached the Gophers defense to a pair of shutouts for the first time since 2006.

References

External links
Minnesota Golden Gophers bio

1979 births
Living people
American football defensive linemen
Allegheny Gators football players
Maine Black Bears football coaches
Rutgers Scarlet Knights football coaches
Thiel Tomcats football coaches
Minnesota Golden Gophers football coaches
Sportspeople from Pittsburgh
Players of American football from Pittsburgh